William Lanne (1835 – 3 March 1869), also spelt William Lanné and also known as King Billy or William Laney, was an Aboriginal Tasmanian man, known for being the last "full-blooded" Aboriginal man in the colony of Tasmania.

Early life and whaling 
Lanne is believed to have been born around 1835. In 1842 he was the youngest child in the last family taken from Cape Grim to the Aboriginal camp at Wybalenna on Flinders Island by George Augustus Robinson. His native name is lost, probably because at seven he was too young when arriving at Wybalenna and so the English name William he was given there stuck. He was the only one of his family to survive Flinders Island. 

In 1847, he temporarily moved to Oyster Cove, and was sent to an orphanage in Hobart until 1851 when he returned. In 1855 the Tasmanian colonial government ordered that all able-bodied men and those of mixed descent from Oyster Cove were to find work outside the settlement. After this, Lanne found work as a whaler in the Tasmanian whaling and sealing industry. When on land he often resided in a local Hobart Town hotel such as the Dog and Partridge Hotel, alongside other shipmates and sailors. Lanne worked on many whaling ships, including the Aladdin, which sailed under the well-known whaler, Captain McArthur, the Jane, the Runnymede and the Sapphire. The latter worked the waters of the Southern, Indian and Pacific Oceans. Lynette Russell has argued that in all but one of the numerous existing portraits of Lanne he is wearing his whaling attire, confidently asserting his identity as a seaman. 

Lanne had a good-humoured personality, was well-spoken and admired among the Hobart community. He is recorded as advocating for improving the living arrangements of the women at Oyster Cove Settlement by writing to colonial officials in 1864. In 1868, he was a guest of honour at the Hobart Regatta, where he met the Duke of Edinburgh. It is here that he was also introduced by the governor as the "King of the Tasmanians". 

Two weeks after returning from a whaling voyage on the Runnymede, which has been whaling the in the southern Pacific Ocean, Lanne died on 3 March 1869 from a combination of cholera and dysentery. He was only 34 years old.

Human remains
Following his death, Lanne's body was dismembered and used for scientific purposes. An argument broke out between the Royal College of Surgeons of England and the Royal Society of Tasmania over who should possess his remains. A member of the English College of Surgeons named William Crowther applied to the government for permission to send the skeleton to the Royal College of Surgeons in London, but his request was denied. Nonetheless, Crowther managed to break into the morgue where Lanne's body was kept, and decapitated the corpse, removed the skin and inserted a skull from a white body into the black skin. The Tasmanian Royal Society soon discovered Crowther's work, and decided to thwart any further attempts to collect "samples" by amputating the hands and feet. Lanne was then buried in this state. 

Because he was accused of the theft of Lanne's head (and the illicit use of another white person's head), Crowther's honorary appointment as surgeon at the Colonial Hospital was terminated. Yet in 1869, the Council of the Royal College of Surgeons awarded him a gold medal and the first fellowship of the college ever awarded to an Australian. Crowther later became Premier of Tasmania. Crowther claimed that, because Lanne had lived much of his life within the European community, his brain had exhibited physical changes, demonstrating "the improvement that takes place in the lower race when subjected to the effects of education and civilisation".

Other colonists took note of Crowther's act:

Although it is not known for certain what happened to the stolen remains of Lanne, a report in The Times in 1912 headed "Conversazione of the Royal Society: recent advances in science" mentions the exhibition of "the desiccated brain of an aboriginal Tasmanian".

Several bodies of Crowther's collection were donated to the anatomy department at the University of Edinburgh. In the 1990s, the Tasmanian Aboriginal Centre believed Lanne's skull to be among them, and requested their return. The remains of Aboriginal people were ultimately returned and reburied, though the university officially denied that any of the remains belonged to Lanne.

Legacy
William Lanne's name is believed to be the source of the "King Billy Pine", or Athrotaxis selaginoides, a native Tasmanian tree now an endangered species, threatened by climate change.

References

External links

 Island Magazine Article on Trugannini and Lanne's bodies desecrations

1830s births
1869 deaths
Deaths from dysentery
Deaths from cholera
Indigenous Tasmanian people
Infectious disease deaths in Tasmania
Australian people in whaling